Chalaroderma ocellata, the two-eyed blenny, is a species of combtooth blenny found in the southeast Atlantic ocean where it is known only from Saldanha Bay to Port Elizabeth in South Africa. This species reaches a length of  SL.

References

ocellata
Fish described in 1908
Taxa named by John Dow Fisher Gilchrist
Taxa named by William Wardlaw Thompson